Blackpool Gate is a settlement in the civil parish of Bewcastle, which is in the district of the City of Carlisle in the county of Cumbria, England. It is in the historic county of Cumberland.

Blackpool Gate lies some five miles south of the border with Scotland and has existed since Roman occupation.

External links 

Hamlets in Cumbria
City of Carlisle